Baby of the House is the unofficial title given to the youngest member of a parliamentary house. The term is most often applied to members of the British parliament from which the term originated. The title is named after the Father of the House, which is given to the longest serving member of the British and other parliaments.

United Kingdom
Becoming the Baby of the House is regarded as something of an achievement despite the lack of any special treatment that comes with the title. However, some MPs who have held the position for a considerable period – Matthew Taylor was the Baby of the House for over ten years – have found it somewhat embarrassing, as it may suggest that they have a lack of experience, although many holders of the title have gone on to enjoy long and distinguished parliamentary careers.

At the turn of the twenty-first century (August 1999 to September 2001), all three of the leaders of the main political parties had been the youngest MPs in their party when they began their political careers (William Hague, Tony Blair, Charles Kennedy).

Of those whose ages can be verified, the youngest MP since the Reform Act 1832 is Mhairi Black, elected in 2015 aged 20 years 237 days. The age of candidacy for Parliament was lowered from 21 to 18 by the Electoral Administration Act 2006. William Pitt the Younger was elected at 21 and became Prime Minister two years later in 1783.

List of Babies of the House of Commons

Youngest member of the House of Lords
The title 'Baby of the House' is not used in the House of Lords, though the youngest member is recorded on the House website. The youngest member of the House is Lord Harlech (born 1 July 1986), a hereditary peer who was elected at a by-election under the House of Lords Act 1999 in July 2021 aged 35. 

The youngest life peer and youngest woman in the House is Baroness Penn (born 1985) who was created a life peer in October 2019 at the age of 34.

Standing Orders state that "No Lord under the age of one and twenty years shall be permitted to sit in the House". When most members of the Lords were hereditary peers, a peer who had inherited his or her peerage(s) while under age was entitled to take a seat on the day before his or her 21st birthday. In theory, such a hereditary peer could still be elected to sit in the House at that age; in practice, the youngest hereditary peer to have been elected was Lord Freyberg (born 15 December 1970), who was elected in October 1999 at the age of 28. 
Hereditary peer Lord Redesdale (born 18 July 1967) was created a life peer on 18 April 2000 at the age of 32, becoming the youngest ever life peer, to enable him to continue to sit after the removal of the majority of hereditary peers.

List of youngest members of the Scottish Parliament
This is a list of youngest members of the Scottish Parliament created in 1999.

List of youngest members of the Senedd
This is a list of youngest members of the Senedd (Welsh Parliament), created in 1999. From its creation in 1999 until May 2020, the Senedd was known as the National Assembly for Wales (Welsh: Cynulliad Cenedlaethol Cymru).

Australia
In Australia the term is rarely used. Most MPs and senators are elected usually only in their thirties and later but some prominent MPs have been elected rather early in life including Prime Ministers Malcolm Fraser and Paul Keating who were both elected at age 25 in 1955 and 1969 respectively. The youngest Baby of the House was Wyatt Roy. He was elected at age 20 in 2010, being the youngest person ever to be elected to an Australian parliament.

, the current Baby of the House is the Member for Brisbane Stephen Bates (age ). Senator Fatima Payman (age 27) is the youngest member of the Senate.

Azerbaijan 
in the 2020 Azerbaijani parliamentary election, Sabina Khasayeva at the age of 27 was the youngest MP elected.

Canada

The youngest-ever elected member of the House of Commons of Canada is Pierre-Luc Dusseault, who was elected at the age of 19 years and 11 months in 2011. Dusseault is the youngest MP in Canadian history. In the past, MPs such as Sean O'Sullivan, Pierre Poilievre, Andrew Scheer, Claude-André Lachance and Lorne Nystrom have also held the distinction.

Eric Melillo is the youngest current MP, representing the riding of Kenora, Ontario, a member of the Conservative Party of Canada; born in 1998, elected at 21 years of age. The youngest member of the Senate of Canada is Patrick Brazeau of Repentigny, Quebec; born 1974, appointed at 34 years of age.

Finland

France

List of youngest members of the French Parliament
This is a list of youngest members of the French parliament.

Germany 
In Germany the term is rarely used. Emilia Fester was the youngest MP elected in the 2021 federal election at the age of 23.

Emily Vontz became the youngest MP in 2023, at the age of 22.

Hong Kong

In Hong Kong the term is rarely used. The current baby of the Legislative Council is Steven Ho who was elected in the 2012 Legislative Council election after all the younger members were either disqualified or resigned.

The youngest-ever elected member from 1991 to 2016 was James To, who ran for the first Legislative Council direct election in 1991 at the age of 28. His record ceased in 2016, when the youngest-ever elected member Nathan Law and the youngest-ever elected female member Yau Wai-ching, were both elected in the 2016 election at the age of 23 and 25 respectively, were both disqualified over the oath-taking controversy between 2016 and 2017. He was replaced by Ho Kai-ming, who was the fourth-youngest member when he was elected in 2016. He was later replaced by Au Nok-hin who was elected in the 2018 by-election but was unseated in 2019. The title went back to Ho who subsequently resigned in May 2020 for joining the government and was replaced by Cheng Chung-tai who was the fifth youngest member in 2016, until himself got disqualified in August 2021. The title eventually returned to Steven Ho who was elected as the youngest member in 2012.

[ (b) – by-election]

Hungary
The youngest-ever elected member of the National Assembly is Ilona Burka, who became MP at the age of 19 years, 5 months and 13 days on 12 May 1971, following the 1971 parliamentary election.

India

[ (b) – by-election]

Iran
Source:

Ireland
In the Republic of Ireland the term is rarely used, as TDs normally enter the Dáil after a political career in local government, usually only in their thirties and later. The current baby of the Dáil is the Fianna Fáil deputy James O'Connor (Cork East), who was 22 years and 7 months old when elected in February 2020.

The youngest TD of all time was William J. Murphy, elected age 21 years 29 days; the youngest female TD was Kathleen O'Connor, 21 years 7 months.

List of Babies of the Dáil

Baby of Seanad Éireann
The youngest senator in Seanad Éireann is Fintan Warfield who was elected as a senator at the age of 24.

The youngest ever senator was Kathryn Reilly, who was 22 when elected in 2011.

Israel
In Israel the term is seldom used. The youngest member of the current Knesset is Shirly Pinto of Yamina elected in 2021 aged 32.

The youngest member of the Knesset ever is Moshe Nissim, elected in 1959 aged 24.

Italy

The youngest member of the Chamber of Deputies ever is Enzo Lattuca (PD), elected in 2013, aged 25 years, 1 month, and 6 days.

Kenya

Malawi
The youngest MP in Malawi was Angela Zachepa who was voted in as MP at age 21.

Malaysia
In Malaysia the term is rarely used. Most MPs and senators are elected usually only in their thirties and later but some prominent MPs have been elected rather early in life including former Prime Minister Najib Razak who was elected at 22 years and 6 months in age in 1976. The youngest-ever elected member of the Dewan Rakyat is Prabakaran Parameswaran, who was elected at the age of 22 years and 3 months in 2018. Prabakaran is the youngest MP in Malaysian history and currently serving as well.

In Malaysia, any citizen 21 years of age or older can become a candidate and be elected to the Dewan Rakyat and Dewan Undangan Negeri. Minimum age for the Senator is 30 by constitution.

Marshall Islands 
In the 2019 general election, Kitlang Kabua became the youngest person ever elected to the Nitijeļā.

New Zealand

The term "Baby of the House" is rarely used in New Zealand. The current Baby of the House is Chlöe Swarbrick of the Green Party, who was elected on 24 September 2017 aged 23. Swarbrick succeeded Todd Barclay of the National Party, who had been elected at the 2014 general election at age 24.

Philippines
In the Congress of the Philippines, the term "Baby of the House" is rarely used; the term "Benjamin" of the chamber is used instead. Special treatment is not given to the youngest member of either chamber. However, by tradition, the youngest member of the chamber usually administers the oath of office to their incoming leader (i.e. President of the Senate and Speaker of the House of Representatives).

The minimum age for being a member of the House of Representatives is 25 years old, while for the Senate, it is 35, as stipulated in the 1987 Constitution of the Philippines. In 1933, Benigno Aquino, Sr. became senator at the age of 33; the Jones Law, which created the Senate, had prescribed the minimum age of 30.

The current Benjamin of the House is Representative Braeden John Biron of the 4th District of Iloilo. Meanwhile, Senator Manny Pacquiao has been the youngest Senator since 2016.

List of youngest members of the Philippine House of Representatives

List of youngest members of the Philippine Senate

Russia 
The youngest member of the 8th State Duma is Georgy Arapov from the New People party.

Singapore

The current youngest MP in Singapore's parliament is Nadia Ahmad Samdin, who was elected at age 30 in 2020. The youngest MP ever elected in Singapore is Lim Chin Siong, who was elected at the age of 22 in the 1955 election.

South Africa
The current, since 2017, titleholder is Hlomela Bucwa of the Democratic Alliance.

Sweden

The current Baby of the House is Daniel Lönn. The youngest person ever to be elected MP to a Swedish parliament is Anton Abele who was only aged 18 when elected in September 2010.
Current record holder for the world's youngest-ever elected MP is Anton Abele, who was at 18 years elected to the Swedish Parliament for his activism against street violence.

Turkey 
Rümeysa Kadak (born 16 May 1996) is the youngest MP in the history of Republic of Turkey .

Uganda

At 19 years old, Proscovia Alengot Oromait was the world's youngest MP and youngest ever MP in Africa when elected in 2011. Oromait is a member of the National Resistance Movement (NRM) in Uganda and was a representative of Usuk County until 2016. She was succeeded by Hellen Auma Wandera as the youngest member of parliament in Uganda.

United States

While the term is used in the Commonwealth Parliaments, Baby of the House or Senate is not in general contemporary use in the United States, nor does being the youngest member confer special treatment in either house of Congress.

Members of the US Congress tend to be older than parliamentarians elsewhere in the English-speaking world, a main factor being that the minimum ages for members of Congress is written into Article One of the United States Constitution, which forbids those under the age of 25 from serving in the House, and those under the age of 30 from serving in the Senate. Moreover, election to the federal Congress is expensive and requires extensive contacts and recognition across a very wide area. Individuals aiming to serve in the federal legislature generally seek election to the state legislature (which generally have lower minimum ages for entry) or other state office before seeking to serve in Washington.

See also
Dean of the House
Dean of the Senate
Father of the House

Notes

References
Youngest Members of Parliament  

Parliament of Australia
Parliament of Canada
House of Commons of the United Kingdom
United States senators
Members of the United States House of Representatives
Parliament of New Zealand